Chantelle Nicholson is a New Zealand chef who has resided in London since 2004. Chef owner of Apricity, on Duke Street in Mayfair and All's Well (formerly of Mare St, E8) and former chef owner of Tredwells (recipient of a green Michelin star for its efforts towards sustainability) and former Group Operations Director for Marcus Wareing Restaurants.

In July 2016 Nicholson won Manager of the Year award at the 2016 The Catey Awards. In October 2016 she won Woman of the Year at the inaugural The Caterer Shine Awards.

Nicholson is co-author of Marcus Wareing's cook books The Gilbert Scott book of British food (selected as the Telegraph "Cookbook of the week"), Nutmeg and Custard, Marcus at Home , New Classics and Marcus Everyday. She did dish development and consulting on the 2015 film Burnt. In 2019 Nicholson published Planted: a chef's show-stopping vegan recipes, described in Vogue as "the ultimate cookbook for food-obsessed vegans". She is neither vegan nor vegetarian but has said that "The whole reason I did a plant-based recipe book was that I liked the challenge ... When I looked around to find resources for plant-based cooking at a restaurant level, there were hardly any."

Selected publications

Philanthropy
Nicholson's charitable causes include cooking for fundraising dinners for Children of the Mountain, Action Against Hunger, The Felix Project, Street Smart, School Food Matters and The Calthorpe Project.

References 

Living people
New Zealand chefs
Women chefs
New Zealand emigrants to England
New Zealand expatriates in England
People from Hamilton, New Zealand
University of Otago alumni
Year of birth missing (living people)